Never a Dull Moment is the collaborative EP by rapper Willie the Kid and producer Lee Bannon. It was released on July 27, 2010 through Apphiliates Music Group and Embassy Entertainment.

Track listing
 "Blades"
 "News Flash"
 "Necessary Way" (featuring La the Darkman)
 "M140 Weighs a Ton"
 "Bath Water Running"
 "Sky Miles" (featuring Currensy)
 "Hickory Smoke"

References

2010 EPs
Willie the Kid (rapper) albums
Albums produced by Fred Warmsley